Gutzlaff Street is a lane in the Central district of Hong Kong, crossing Stanley Street, Wellington Street, Gage Street and Lyndhurst Terrace.

Etymology
One of the oldest streets in Hong Kong, it was dedicated to the 19th-century Prussian  Christian missionary Karl Gutzlaff, who also worked for the British East India Company and then the colonial Hong Kong government. In 19th century, the street in Chinese was  recorded in several directories.

History

Before the Second World War, the lane was known as "Red-haired Dame Street" by the locals, "red-haired" then being a common adjective for describing Westerners. One version goes that, in the old days, western women in Hong Kong were frequently seen near the street, as there were plenty of Chinese shoemakers, who were crafted in making western-style shoes, doing business in that area, hence the name and another nickname "Shoe Repairing Street".

Another version goes that some western brothels operated there during the early days of colonial Hong Kong, hence the name. Today the street is known by some local gourmets, as one of the few surviving dai pai dong is located there.

Latest finding shown the tenements in Nos. 2-10 Gutzlaff Street was inhabited by a legendary and powerful lady Ng Akew, aka Hung Mo Kew (Red-haired Kew).  The popular name Hung Mo Kew Street (‘Red-haired Kew Street’) was coined for Gutzlaff Street subsequently.

See also
 List of streets and roads in Hong Kong

External links

"Shoe Repairing Street" 

Central, Hong Kong
Street markets in Hong Kong
Roads on Hong Kong Island